is a Japanese Nordic combined skier. He was born in Aizuwakamatsu, Fukushima. He competed in the World Cup 2015 season.

He represented Japan at the FIS Nordic World Ski Championships 2015 in Falun.

References

External links 
 

1993 births
Living people
Japanese male Nordic combined skiers
Meiji University alumni
Sportspeople from Fukushima Prefecture
Universiade medalists in nordic combined
Universiade silver medalists for Japan
Competitors at the 2015 Winter Universiade